The 1983 ABN World Tennis Tournament was a men's tennis tournament played on indoor carpet courts at the Rotterdam Ahoy in the Netherlands. It was part of the 1983 Volvo Grand Prix circuit. It was the 11th edition of the tournament and was held from 14 March through 20 March 1983. Gene Mayer won the singles title.

Finals

Singles

 Gene Mayer defeated  Guillermo Vilas 6–1, 7–6(11–9)

Doubles
 Fritz Buehning /  Tom Gullikson defeated  Peter Fleming /  Pavel Složil 7–6, 4–6, 7–6

References

External links
 Official website 
 ATP tournament profile
 ITF tournament details

 
ABN World Tennis Tournament
1983 in Dutch tennis